The 2015 Northwest Territories Men's Curling Championship was held from February 4 to 8 at the Inuvik Curling Club in Inuvik, Northwest Territories. It was the first territorial men's championship to be held since the Northwest Territories gained a direct entry to the Brier, Canada's national men's curling championship. Prior to 2015, the top two teams in the territory played in the Yukon/NWT Men's Curling Championship, with the winner going to the Brier. The winning team will represent the Northwest Territories at the 2015 Tim Hortons Brier in Calgary.

Teams
The teams are listed as follows:

Round-robin standings
Final round-robin standings

Round-robin results

Draw 1
Wednesday, February 4, 8:00 pm

Draw 2
Thursday, February 5, 1:00 pm

Draw 3
Thursday, February 5, 7:00 pm

Draw 4
Friday, February 6, 10:00 am

Draw 5
Friday, February 6, 3:00 pm

Final
Saturday, February 7, 2:00 pm

External links

2015 Tim Hortons Brier
Curling in the Northwest Territories
Inuvik
2015 in the Northwest Territories
February 2015 sports events in Canada